Women & Songs: Beginnings Volume 2 is the second "beginnings" album in the Women & Songs franchise.

Overview 
The album was released on December 4, 2001, the same day as Women & Songs 5.  32 tracks that helped launch successful careers for some of the best female artists in the industry are included on this 2-disc collection.

The album begins with pure Aretha Franklin singing You Make Me Feel Like A Natural Woman, leads through some classic music on its way to Don't It Make My Brown Eyes Blue by Crystal Gayle, straight into Tina Turner's Private Dancer, and eventually nears an end with Whatever Will Be Will Be by Doris Day.  And that's only the first disc; Jackie DeShannon appears on the second disc with What The World Needs Now Is Love, while Little Eva sings the party classic The Loco-Motion - a song that later appears on Women & Songs: 60s Girl Groups.

Track listing

Disc 1 
 You Make Me Feel Like A Natural Woman
(performed by Aretha Franklin)
 Walk On By
(performed by Dionne Warwick)
 You've Changed
(performed by Billie Holiday)
 I'm Sorry
(performed by Brenda Lee)
 You Don't Own Me
(performed by Lesley Gore)
 You Don't Know How Glad I Am
(performed by Nancy Wilson)
 End Of The World
(performed by Skeeter Davis)
 Don't It Make My Brown Eyes Blue
(performed by Crystal Gayle)
 Private Dancer
(performed by Tina Turner)
 MacArthur Park
(performed by Donna Summer)
 Love Is Like A Heatwave
(performed by Martha Reeves)
 Release Me
(performed by Esther Phillips)
 Who's Sorry Now
(performed by Connie Francis)
 It That All There Is
(performed by Peggy Lee)
 Whatever Will Be Will Be
(performed by Doris Day)
 Mister Sandman
(performed by Emmylou Harris)

Disc 2 
 Anticipation
(performed by Carly Simon)
 Rose Garden
(performed by Lynne Anderson)
 Baby Don't Go
(performed by Sonny & Cher)
 What The World Needs Now Is Love
(performed by Jackie DeShannon)
 Goldfinger
(performed by Shirley Bassey)
 Mangos
(performed by Rosemary Clooney)
 Johnny Get Angry
(performed by Joanie Sommers)
 I Cried A Tear
(performed by Lavern Baker)
 The Loco-Motion
(performed by Little Eva)
 Easier Said Than Done
(performed by The Essex)
 Johnny Angel
(performed by Shelley Fabares)
 Your Precious Love (with Tammi Terrell)
(performed by Marvin Gaye)
 What's New
(performed by Linda Ronstadt)
 Cry Me A River
(performed by Julie London)
 Love Me Or Leave Me
(performed by Lena Horne)
 La Vie En Rose
(performed by Edith Piaf)

2001 compilation albums